Georges Dufayel  (1 January 1855 – 28 December 1916) was a Parisian retailer and businessman who popularized and expanded the practice of buying merchandise on credit (installment plans) and purchasing from catalogues. He is mainly remembered as the founder of the Grands Magasins Dufayel, a large and opulent department store in the Goutte d'Or district of Paris that sold household furnishings. It closed in 1930, but the building, somewhat modified, still stands.

Biography 

Georges Jules Dufayel was born in Paris in 1855, the son of Achille Amand Dufayel and Marie Stéphanie Nicolas. He attended the Maison Dupont-Tuffier school. In 1871, he went to work for Jacques François Crespin (1824–1888), the owner of Le Palais de la Nouveauté in Paris's 18th arrondissement. The store, which Crespin had founded in 1856, sold furnishings and housewares on credit. 

Crespin died in 1888. The thirty-three-year-old Dufayel, who had been his close associate, took over direction of the enterprise. In 1890, he became sole proprietor and renamed the store Les Grands Magasins Dufayel. Over the next few years, he developed a new and flamboyant type of retailing. He gradually enlarged the store to include a concert hall, theatre, and winter garden, and offered free lectures, science demonstrations, films, and performances there to draw in customers. The building was topped with a dome surmounted by a searchlight and decorated with sculptures by Alexandre Falguière and Jules Dalou. 

Although Dufayel is remembered for popularizing the method of selling goods on credit, the idea originated with Jacques François Crespin, who began by selling photographs on credit, and later built the store in which he also used this selling technique. Dufayel, however, built on Crespin's innovation by selling coupons or tokens that allowed customers to buy goods by making a downpayment of 20 percent of the price and repaying the rest in weekly instalments. These tokens were accepted in more than 400 stores throughout France and Dufayel received 18 percent commission on all sales. The system allowed customers to buy furniture and housewares affordably over time.   

Moreover, Dufayel's store was located in a working-class area (unlike department stores such as Le Bon Marché, Samaritaine, Printemps, or Galeries Lafayette), and allowed those of more modest means access to the same kinds of shopping experience as middle-class customers. "It encouraged workers to approach shopping as a social activity, just as the bourgeoisie did at the famous department stores in central Paris."  

The building was designed to both awe and delight customers. "The entrance porch was richly ornamented with carvings and statues representing themes like 'Credit' and 'Publicity' and surmounted by a dome 180 feet high. Inside the building were 200 statues, 180 paintings, pillars, decorative panels, bronze allegorical figures holding candelabras, painted ceramics and glass, and grand staircases, as well as a theatre seating 3000 that was decorated with silk curtains, white-and-gold foliage wreaths, and immense mirrors."

Dufayel operated on a large scale. "By 1900 this Napoleon of the installment plan had expanded his clientele to 2.4 million; by 1904 the figure had reached 3.5 million. At that point he employed 800 investigators, who checked up on the solvency of his clients by such means as bribing concierges for information." In fact, these 800 "investigators" who collected debts were also collecting data for a 19th-century version of a database. "The company, in turn, used the information these salesmen gathered to strike out in new commercial directions. Dufayel became one of the first French advertising agencies that published surveys and compiled mailing lists."
 
Between 1901 and 1904, Dufayel published a real-estate catalogue called Indicateur Dufayel, which carried advertisements for apartments and houses for sale or rent. Dufayel also acted as his own banker (and that of other retailers), sold insurance, and operated a publicity business that "covered the walls of Paris with advertising posters."

The working conditions in Dufayel's store were the subject of some complaints. Employees worked long hours and could be fined for being late. In December 1905, the staff of Dufayel went on strike, protesting the actions of two managers who were considered to be unfairly punitive and capricious. The strike lasted only a few days and little was accomplished.

With his wealth, Dufayel amassed an art collection and bought a house on the avenue Champs-Elysées that had previously belonged to the Duchesse d'Uzès. He demolished the house and started to build an even grander mansion, designed by architect Gustave Rives, who had also worked on the Grands Magasins Dufayel. "One of the most expensive and most pretentious town houses in the world, it was built for the millionaire furniture merchant Dufayel shortly before the [First World] war, but he felt that it was too gorgeous to be lived in and until his death he resided in a more modest dwelling abutting on the court of the palace." After Dufayel died in 1916, the house was used by the French government during the Peace Conference of 1919 as a club for conference officials and members of the foreign press. It was later bought by Standard Oil, but demolished in the early 1920s and replaced by an arcade.

Dufayel also used his wealth to create a seaside resort at Sainte-Adresse, near Le Havre, on the English Channel. It was called "Le Nice-Havrais", designed by architect Ernest Daniel, with imposing buildings and a promenade similar to the one in Nice in the south of France. Gustave Rives contributed designs for the large Immeuble Dufayel, which still stands in the middle of the town, and the Hôtellerie, which was used by the Belgian government in First World War (it was destroyed by the German army in the Second World War). In the resort town, Dufayel was known as "l'homme à la baignoire d'argent" (the man with the silver bathtub).

Dufayel's obituary in the New York Times notes that he was an officer of the Legion of Honour, a member of the Jury of awards at the Exposition Universelle (1900) in Paris, and a member of the Paris Automobile and Aero Clubs.

Spurned by high society because of his modest origins and his ostentatious tastes, Dufayel avoided all scandal and adopted the motto: "Bien faire et laisser dire," that is, "Do good and let them talk."

References

External links 
 Chronology (in French) of the Dufayel department store 
 

1855 births
1916 deaths
Shops in Paris
Department stores of France
Retail buildings in France
Buildings and structures in the 18th arrondissement of Paris